The oxalyl cation, also known as oxalic, has the chemical formula [C2O2]2+. It is the cation derived from oxalic acid.

Chemical compounds containing the oxalyl cation include:

Related compounds/ions
Oxalic acid, C2O4H2
The oxalate anion, [C2O4]2−
Oxalic anhydride, C2O3
Acyl halides of oxalic acid, including:
Oxalyl chloride, C2O2Cl2
Oxalyl fluoride, C2O2F2

Oxycations

References